Any Given Sunday is a 1999 American sports drama film directed by Oliver Stone depicting a fictional professional American football team. The film features an ensemble cast, including Al Pacino, Cameron Diaz, Dennis Quaid, Jamie Foxx, James Woods, LL Cool J, Ann-Margret, Lauren Holly, Matthew Modine, John C. McGinley, Charlton Heston, Bill Bellamy, Lela Rochon, Aaron Eckhart, Elizabeth Berkley, and  NFL players Jim Brown and Lawrence Taylor. It is partly based on the 1984 novel On Any Given Sunday by NFL defensive end Pat Toomay; the title is derived from a line in the book (also used in the film) that a team can win or lose on "any given Sunday", said by the fictitious coach Tony D'Amato.

Cameo roles also featured many former American football players including Dick Butkus, Y. A. Tittle, Pat Toomay, Warren Moon, Johnny Unitas, Ricky Watters, Emmitt Smith and Terrell Owens, as well as coach Barry Switzer.

Plot

The Miami Sharks, a once-great American football team, are struggling to make the 2001 Affiliated Football Franchises of America (AFFA) playoffs. They are coached by thirty-year veteran Tony D'Amato, who has fallen out of favor with young team owner Christina Pagniacci, and his offensive coordinator, as well as D'Amato's expected successor, Nick Crozier. In the thirteenth game of the season, both starting quarterback Jack "Cap" Rooney and second-string quarterback Tyler Cherubini are injured and forced to leave the field. The desperate Sharks call upon third-string quarterback Willie Beamen to replace them. While a nervous Beamen makes a number of errors and fails to win the game for the Sharks, he plays well and gains confidence. Rooney vows to make it back by the playoffs, with D'Amato promising to not give up on him.

The next day, D'Amato and Pagniacci argue about the direction of the team. Pagniacci favors Crozier and wants to eventually cut Rooney. D'Amato argues that Pagniacci's father, the previous owner, would never meddle in his coaching plans. During the next game, to D'Amato's chagrin, Beamen disregards the team's conservative offense and changes plays in the huddle. As the media hails Beamen as the next model of quarterback, the newfound success feeds his growing narcissism and leads to tension with teammates and coaches. During a confrontation with Beamen, D'Amato demotes him back to the bench. After Beamen gives an interview taking sole credit for the Sharks' winning streak, the other players refuse to perform for Beamen and consequently lose a home game. After Beamen gets into a brawl with Julian "J-Man" Washington, an irate D'Amato expresses his embarrassment at his team before leaving. Beamen contemplates and amends his self-centered behavior.

As the playoffs come around, Sharks middle linebacker Luther Lavay reminds Beamen how lucky he is to be in the league and to find a life outside of football; his words fall on deaf ears. D'Amato worsens his relationship with Pagniacci and berates Rooney for second-guessing his availability. Before the game, D'Amato gives a speech urging team unity that Beamen takes to heart and energizes the rest of the team. Rooney returns as starting quarterback, but is injured with a concussion after scoring a touchdown. Rooney urges D'Amato to let Beamen finish the game; after an argument, D'Amato relents. Subsequently, Pagniacci enters the locker room to demand that D'Amato play Beamen. After she and D'Amato argue, Beamen informs her that he had already been told he would start the second half. Beamen apologizes to his teammates for his actions and leads the team to win. In a post-game talk with D'Amato, Beamen dedicates the next game to Rooney, but admits that he is worried about his ongoing health.

An epilogue voiceover says that the Sharks eventually lost the championship final (the Pantheon Cup) to San Francisco. At D'Amato's final press conference as head coach, he is thanked by Pagniacci. D'Amato is expected to announce his retirement, but he instead drops two bombshells and announces that he has been hired as head coach and general manager of an expansion team in New Mexico, the Albuquerque Aztecs, and that he has signed Willie Beamen to be his starting quarterback and franchise player.

Cast
 Al Pacino as Tony D'Amato, head coach of the Miami Sharks. Having held his position for decades and been given much autonomy by the team's owner, "Tony D" is respected for great successes, including two Pantheon Cups, the championship for this (fictional) professional football league. He devoted so much time to the team, he became estranged from his wife and children. D'Amato's traditional methods have come under fire from management and the media for recent failures, including missing the playoffs. Bitter that he was never promoted to general manager, D'Amato resents the hands-on "interference" of Christina Pagniacci, who succeeded her father Arturo as team owner. His last name comes from boxing trainer Constantine "Cus" D'Amato.
 Cameron Diaz as Christina Pagniacci, owner and general manager. She inherited the team from her father and boasts a Cornell MBA. She attributes the team's disappointments to Coach D'Amato's "old-school methods" and takes a more hands-on approach, bringing in innovative new offensive coordinator Nick Crozier as his eventual successor. She hints that D'Amato will not return after his contract expires, adding to his distractions. She also threatens to move the franchise if the city refuses to build a new stadium, causing a confrontation with the AFFA Commissioner and the Mayor of Miami.
 Dennis Quaid as Jack "Cap" Rooney, starting quarterback and team captain. Seen as being like a son to D'Amato, the two have been credited with the team's greatest on-field successes. Rooney is now an aging veteran who faces injuries and conflicts with team personnel. Pagniacci wants to dump him. Relations have soured between Rooney and wife Cindy (Lauren Holly), who goads him without sympathy for his physical or mental situation, mercilessly browbeating him when he even mentions retiring. He is injured during a game and is replaced, but is determined to make a comeback. Rooney recovers in time for the first round of the playoffs, wherein he plays well until suffering a hard hit while scoring a touchdown before halftime.
 James Woods as Dr. Harvey Mandrake, the unscrupulous team physician. He risks serious injury to players to enable the team to have a better shot at winning, often at the direction of Pagniacci. He is later fired after his unethical methods are discovered by the conscientious team internist.
 Jamie Foxx as Willie "Steamin" Beamen, the third-string quarterback. Beamen has a history that eventually led him to distrust his coaches. In particular, while playing for San Diego, Beamen was made into a defensive secondary player for having "fast feet" and was eventually injured while making a tackle. Beamen initially believes that racism played a major role in his history of being denied opportunities he desired, using an alternative of "placeism" to describe a lack of African-American quarterbacks and head coaches in pro football. He takes over as starter after injuries to Rooney and the backup quarterback. Though surprisingly successful, Beamen causes tension among staff and teammates. He frequently changes the plays the coach calls, or just calls his own. These acts create major tension with D'Amato. D'Amato respects Beamen's athletic ability and acknowledges that his talents warrant him to be a quarterback, but heavily criticizes his lack of leadership skills and intangibles. He is granted his own music video and even asks owner Pagniacci for a date when she enters a postgame locker room full of naked or partly dressed players like himself. Beamen's antics on and off the field eventually get him demoted to the bench by D'Amato, who firmly believes that a quarterback's most important role is to lead the team and help keep them confident, both of which Beamen took a clear disregard for. Beamen later matures and is inspired by "Cap" Rooney's gutsy performance in the Sharks' first playoff game.
 LL Cool J as Julian "J-Man" Washington, starting running back. He is very good but becomes increasingly angry at Beamen for his cockiness and tendencies to take plays away from him. He is motivated by incentive clauses in his contract, and D'Amato refers to him as a "merc" (mercenary) "who will be gone before next season." Washington later redeems himself to the team by running out-of-bounds in order to stop the play clock while his team was attempting an offensive drive with little time left.
 Ann-Margret as Margaret Pagniacci, Christina's mother and the widow of the Sharks' original owner Arturo.
 Lauren Holly as Cindy Rooney, wife of Cap Rooney. It is heavily implied that she is no more than a trophy wife, caring more for her wealth and social status than for her husband's health and well-being.
 Lawrence Taylor as Luther "Shark" Lavay, starting middle linebacker and the captain of the defense. He has a cortisone addiction and is nearing the twilight of a very successful career. Held in high esteem by D'Amato for "revolutionizing" his position by being highly skilled in both pass rushing and defending against the run. Mandrake has concealed that "Shark" is suffering from a previous injury, a broken neck that did not heal properly. If he suffers a serious hit again, he may be killed, permanently disabled, or suffer from seizures. The team's internist informs him and D'Amato of the situation, but "Shark" says he will lose a one million dollar bonus if he does not make his incentive stats of one sack and three tackles or retires as Powers suggests. He also has a confrontation with Beamen over the role of offense vs. defense (which culminates with him cutting Beamen's Chevrolet Suburban in half with a circular saw during a party). While making a hit, Shark gets knocked unconscious. He awakens and is hauled off on a stretcher, satisfied that he made his one million dollar bonus.
 Jim Brown as Monte "Montezuma" Monroe, defensive coordinator. He is vocal and brings intensity to the defense and to the team in general. A longtime friend of D'Amato, who personally confides in Montezuma several times. Monroe states at one point he would like to return to high school coaching where the game is "pure."
 Aaron Eckhart as Nick Crozier, offensive coordinator. Nick is an offensive guru brought in from Minnesota by Christina Pagniacci. Young and tech-savvy (making use of a laptop computer while calling plays), he is highly critical of Tony's old-fashioned ways, as well as Beamen's changing the plays in the huddle and Julian's playing for contract incentives. Despite the tension, D'Amato recognizes Crozier's talent. He is named D'Amato's successor after the coach departs to lead an expansion franchise in New Mexico.
 Bill Bellamy as Jimmy Sanderson, the Wide Receiver who becomes Willie Beamen's first option on offense once he is moved into the starting Quarterback position, adding to the friction already building up between Willie and Julian.
 Matthew Modine as Dr. Ollie Powers, the team's internist. He discovers Dr. Mandrake covering for players who are suffering from near-career-ending injuries but are overdosing on painkillers, steroids and hormones to cover the pain. Powers faces his own dilemma in the need to relieve the players' pain vs. prescribing too much medication at the insistence of the addicted players.
 John C. McGinley as Jack Rose, an abrasive and prominent sports reporter. On his own cable show, Rose displays an incredible distaste for all things D'Amato. This leads to D'Amato physically assaulting Rose near the end of the regular season, but no charges are pressed after D'Amato makes a public apology. In spite of their rivalry (or even because of it) he confesses that he will miss D'Amato when he retires.
 Lela Rochon as Vanessa Struthers, Longtime girlfriend of Willie Beamen who unsuccessfully tries to pressure him into marriage after being humiliated by Cindy Rooney in front of the other Football wives.
 Elizabeth Berkley as Mandy Murphy, a high priced escort who provides Tony with a girlfriend experience (GFE) when he is feeling lonely.
 Clifton Davis as Mayor Tyrone Smalls, who is always a few steps ahead of Christina in her efforts to leverage him into using taxpayer money to build a new stadium for the Sharks.
 Charlton Heston as AFFA Football Commissioner
 Andrew Bryniarski as Patrick "Madman" Kelly
 James Karen and Gianni Russo as Christina's Advisors
 Duane Martin as Willie's Agent
 Pat O'Hara as Tyler Cherubini
 Mazio Royster as Wide Receiver
 Rick Johnson as Dallas Quarterback
 Allan Graf as Referee
 Margaret Betts as Mayor's Aide
 Lester Speight as Sharks' Security Guard
 Eva Tamargo as Tunnel Reporter - Game 3
 Delia Sheppard and Jaime Bergman as Party Girls
 Dan Sileo as Dallas Defensive Tackle
 Sean Stone as Fan (as Sean C. Stone)
 Antoni Corone as Fan
Cameos
 Dick Butkus
 Terrell Owens
 Ricky Watters
 Irving Fryar
 Joe Schmidt
 Oliver Stone
 Barry Switzer
 Y. A. Tittle
 Warren Moon
 Johnny Unitas
 Pat Toomay
 Emmitt Smith
 Wilt Chamberlain (uncredited)

Production

Development
Oliver Stone developed a script called Monday Night written by Jamie Williams, a former tight end for the Nebraska Cornhuskers and later the San Francisco 49ers, and Richard Weiner, a sports journalist. Stone separately acquired the spec script On Any Given Sunday, by John Logan. Stone later amalgamated a third screenplay, Playing Hurt by Daniel Pyne, into the project.

As of May 1, 1999, the screenplay's cover page listed the following writers: original draft by Jamie Williams & Richard Weiner, John Logan, Daniel Pyne; subsequent revisions by Gary Ross; revisions by Raynold Gideon & Bruce A. Evans; revisions by John Logan; revisions by Lisa Amsterdam & Robert Huizenga; latest revisions by Oliver Stone.

The Writers Guild of America ultimately awarded screenplay credit to Logan and Stone, with "story" credit to Pyne and Logan. Williams and Weiner went uncredited for their original screenplay, but were credited for their work on the film as technical consultants.

The screenplay was also based in part on the 1994 book You're Okay, It's Just a Bruise: A Doctor's Sideline Secrets by Robert Huizenga. Huizenga was the intern doctor for the Los Angeles Raiders in their 1980s heyday, working under Dr. Robert T. Rosenfeld, who dismissed many players' injuries with the phrase, "You're okay, it's just a bruise." James Woods' character was based on Rosenfeld, and his first diagnosis of "Cap" Rooney's career-threatening injury at the beginning of the film is "you're okay, it's just a bruise." Huizenga left the Raiders in the early 1990s, disgusted at the way the medical advice was kept from players and Rosenfeld being allowed to continue treating them after several mishaps, one of which is closely mirrored in the film—Shark's neck injury and risk of sudden death, based on the real-life Mike Harden case.

Casting

Director Oliver Stone's first two choices to play Tony D'Amato were Al Pacino and Robert De Niro. Henry Rollins was offered a role as a football player but turned it down as he felt he did not have the size to make the portrayal believable. Sean "P. Diddy" Combs was cast as Willie Beamen, but dropped out amidst rumors he could not throw a football convincingly. Publicly Combs dropped off the project because of scheduling conflicts with his recording career. According to Cuba Gooding Jr., he met with Oliver Stone about playing the role of Willie Beamen but Stone turned Gooding down because he had already played a football player in Jerry Maguire (1996). Chris Tucker turned down the role of Willie Beamen. George Clooney was offered the role of Jack Rooney but turned it down. Ving Rhames was originally cast in a role in the film, but later dropped due to production delays and scheduling conflicts with Mission: Impossible 2.

Five Pro Football Hall of Fame Players made cameo appearances as opposing head coaches. Bob St. Clair appears as the coach for Minnesota in the first game. Y. A. Tittle, for Chicago, the second game. Dick Butkus, with California, the road game. Warren Moon, with New York in the rain soaked game. For the final game in Dallas, Johnny Unitas appears as the coach.

Jim Caviezel played Tony D'Amato's estranged son, but his scenes were cut. They can be seen in the extras of the Oliver Stone Collection DVD. Tom Sizemore also had a role in the film, but it too was cut.

Principal photography
The film was shot in Miami, Florida and Irving, Texas. Miami's Orange Bowl stadium represents the home of the fictitious American football team, the Miami Sharks. When the team traveled to California, the stadium used was Pro Player Stadium, which is located in Miami Gardens. Texas Stadium is used for the home of the fictitious Dallas Knights.

Director Oliver Stone requested, but did not receive, the National Football League's permission to use real NFL team logos and stadiums for the film. As a result, the fictional Affiliated Football Franchises of America (AFFA) was created (not to be confused with the real AFA). The AFFA apparently exists alongside the NFL, since the Miami Dolphins are mentioned.

For the scenes during a football game, production asked local schools to participate as extras for the film, including Lake Stevens Middle School in Miami, Florida. For each shot the crowd was asked to move around so that each section looked filled. In empty seats cardboard cutouts were placed in seats with balloons attached to them so that they would seem in motion.

For the practice scenes they used the baseball arena Homestead Sports Complex.

The film also used Arena Football League players such Pat O'Hara, who played for the Tampa Bay Storm, later coached the Orlando Predators and is now an assistant coach with the Tennessee Titans, and Connell Maynor, who also played for the Orlando Predators and spent time as both a player and coach for the Philadelphia Soul. Bjorn Nittmo, then with the AFL's Buffalo Destroyers, was the Sharks' placekicker. Matt Martinez, a former Gurkha & ex-husband of Niki Taylor and linebacker for the AFL's Miami Hooters, played himself, #31 for the Sharks.

Soundtrack

A soundtrack containing hip hop, rock and R&B music was released on January 4, 2000, by Atlantic Records. It peaked at #28 on the Billboard 200 and #11 on the Top R&B/Hip-Hop Albums.

Oliver Stone wanted to use the music of the Canadian band Godspeed You! Black Emperor and actually filmed a scene using their music; when he later asked for permission the band said no, and Stone was forced to redo the scene without the music.

Film composer Richard Horowitz, who supplied the original score, published his complete music for the film on a promotional CD.

Release

Box office
Any Given Sunday was a financial success; made on a budget of $55 million, it went on to earn  $100.2 million worldwide.

Reception

Time Out New Yorks Andrew Johnston wrote: "It's often been said of films about sports that smaller balls equal better movies. Any Given Sunday explodes that theory, and not just because of the incredible intensity of its gridiron action. Oliver Stone's best movie in many years—and one of his finest ever—looks at the world of professional football from almost every conceivable angle, but it never tries to be the definitive statement on the subject. A surprisingly balanced film that merges Stone's hyperkinetic style with a character-centric narrative approach reminiscent of John Sayles and Robert Altman at their best, Sunday proves that powerful human drama and MTV visual pyrotechnics actually can coexist after all."

Roger Ebert of the Chicago Sun-Times also gave the film a mostly positive review, awarding it 3 out of 4 stars, but criticized its length: "I guess I recommend the movie because the dramatic scenes are worth it. Pacino has some nice heart-to-hearts with Quaid and Foxx, and the psychology of the veteran coach is well-captured in the screenplay by Stone and John Logan. But if some studio executive came along and made Stone cut his movie down to two hours, I have the strangest feeling it wouldn't lose much of substance and might even play better."

Conversely, Richard Schickel of Time criticized the story as being "standard" and stated "(a)lmost three hours of this jitter deteriorates from bravura filmmaking to annoying mannerism, and Any Given Sunday ends up less than the sum of its many, often interesting parts." Rick Groen of The Globe and Mail wrote that the story was "(c)hoc-a-bloc with manly blather about sacrifice and honour and rugged individuals pulling together for the greater glory of the team." And, elaborating on many critics' shared observations that the movie was "hyperkinetic", Jack Matthews of the New York Daily News states that "the sensation we get from the blizzard of images and teeth-jarring sound effects is of having our head used as the football."

The film received an aggregated score of 52% from 127 reviews on Rotten Tomatoes, with an average rating of 5.5/10. The site's consensus states: "Sometimes entertaining, but overall Any Given Sunday is a disappointment coming from Oliver Stone." On Metacritic, Any Given Sunday has an aggregated score of 52% based on reviews from 33 critics, indicating "mixed or average reviews". Audiences polled by CinemaScore gave the film an average grade of "B−" on an A+ to F scale.

Director's cut
When released to home video on VHS and DVD, a new director's cut by Oliver Stone was used. Due to the packaging listing "6 minutes of previously unseen footage" and a running time of 156 minutes, many assumed that the theatrical cut was 150 minutes, and that Stone had added six minutes of footage. In actuality, the theatrical cut ran 162 minutes; 12 minutes were deleted for the director's cut, and six minutes of new footage were added. Stone said these changes were made to help with the film's pacing.

References

External links

 
 

1999 films
1999 drama films
1990s English-language films
1990s sports drama films
American football films
American sports drama films
Films directed by Oliver Stone
Films produced by Lauren Shuler Donner
Films produced by Clayton Townsend
Films scored by Robbie Robertson
Films set in Los Angeles
Films set in Miami
Films shot in Miami
Films shot in Texas
Films with screenplays by John Logan
Films with screenplays by Oliver Stone
Warner Bros. films
1990s American films